Cogent Systems, Inc. is a manufacturer of automated fingerprint identification systems (AFIS).

On January 20, 2006, the City of Pasadena (CA) announces Cogent Systems' impending relocation from South Pasadena to Pasadena.

On August 30, 2010 3M announced they acquired Cogent Systems for $943M.

On September 2, 2010, Steven Davidoff Solomon of the New York Times wrote about three of Cogent's shareholders objecting to what they considered 3M's low purchase offer.

On December 9, 2016, Gemalto announced they have purchased 3M's Identity Management Business (which includes Cogent Systems, Inc., Document Reader, and Secure Materials Business) for US$850 million.

On May 1, 2017, 3M announces completing sale of its Identity Management Business to Gemalto.

References

Technology companies established in 1990
Companies based in Los Angeles County, California
Defunct technology companies based in California
2010 mergers and acquisitions
2017 mergers and acquisitions
Technology companies disestablished in 2010